Sandy Cape (also known by the Indigenous name of Woakoh) is the most northern point on Fraser Island (also known as K'gari and Gari) off the coast of Queensland, Australia. The place was named Sandy Cape for its appearance by James Cook during his 1770 voyage up the eastern coast of Australia aboard the Endeavour. To the south the next two ocean headlands are Waddy Point and Indian Head (the latter was also named by Cook noting "...on which a number of Natives were assembled..." and is also known as Tukkee in the Badtjala language, meaning stone or stone knife).

The cape is protected within the K'gari section of the Great Sandy National Park. Nesting loggerhead and green turtles use the remote, sandy location as a rookery. Nighttime driving along the beach at Sandy Cape is banned during the nesting season. The vegetation at the cape is stunted and windswept. The foredunes are lightly covered by spinifex grass.

Vehicle access to Sandy Cape is only available by the eastern beach at low tide. Camping is permitted in the area and it is a popular location with anglers.

History
Matthew Flinders, traveling aboard the Investigator, landed at Sandy Cape in 1802 and noted the desolate landscape. In August 1803, the ships Cato and Porpoise were both sunk off the cape in bad weather.

In late December 1842, HMS Fly anchored behind Sandy Cape where some crewmen and naturalists went ashore and commented on the poor sparse surroundings. The Fly returned in April 1845 and took water from an abundant supply behind the beach and about 7 miles within the Cape.

The Seabelle was wrecked in 1857, the American Bark "Panama" in 1864, and the Chang Chow in 1884 in waters closer to the cape which may contain hidden sandbars. Because of the number of shipwrecks in the vicinity the Sandy Cape Light was constructed in 1870. This marked the first permanent European settlement on Fraser Islnd.

The SS Marloo was wrecked in September 1914.

Clement Lindley Wragge set up an extensive network of weather stations around Queensland, including one at Sandy Cape in 1891. The cape is still used as a reference point for weather observations; however from May 2015, it has been downgraded to a daily observation, compared with the half-hourly observations at some other weather stations.

See also

 Double Island Point
 List of lighthouses in Australia

References

Headlands of Queensland
Fraser Island